Maharashtra State Highway 2, (commonly referred to as MH SH 2), is a  state highway in northern Maharashtra. This nomenclature is adopted for a short 55-kilometer state highway; the route is as follows (includes major villages): Mhasavad – Islampur – Lakkadkot – Ranipur – Nagziri – Toranmal. It connects the above-mentioned villages to the tehsil headquarter at Shahada. The traffic on the route being limited, it's designed for light two-way traffic only.

Summary

Distance chart

Route description 
Below is the brief summary of the route followed by this state highway.

Nandurbar District

Shahada Taluka

Dhadgaon Taluka

Major junctions

National Highways 
This highway does not intersect with any National Highways.

State Highways 
  Major State Highway 1 at Mhasavad village, Shahada Taluka, Nandurbar District

Connections 
Many villages, cities and towns in various districts are connected by this state highway.

Nandurbar District

References

See also 
 List of state highways in Maharashtra

State Highways in Maharashtra